Sealaska Corporation is one of thirteen Alaska Native Regional Corporations created under the Alaska Native Claims Settlement Act of 1971 (ANCSA) in settlement of aboriginal land claims.  Sealaska was incorporated in Alaska on June 16, 1972. Headquartered in Juneau, Alaska, Sealaska is a for-profit corporation with more than 23,000 Alaska Native shareholders primarily of Tlingit, Haida, and Tsimshian descent.  In 1981 Sealaska Corporation sponsored the creation of the non-profit Sealaska Heritage Foundation, now the Sealaska Heritage Institute, which manages its cultural and educational programs. Sealaska’s primary economic drivers are natural resources, land management, environmental services and seafood.

Shareholders

At incorporation, Sealaska enrolled 15,782 Alaska Natives, each of whom received 100 shares of Sealaska stock. Approximately 1,800 additional Alaska Natives have since received Sealaska stock through inheritance of shares or gifting. As an ANCSA corporation, Sealaska has no publicly traded stock and its shares cannot legally be sold.

Sealaska shareholders voted on June 23, 2007 to enroll qualified descendants of original shareholders by issuing them 100 shares of life estate stock in Sealaska. However, unlike shares of original shareholders, the new shares would expire on the descendant's death and could not be willed or gifted. To be eligible, descendants must be children or grandchildren of original Sealaska shareholders, must be of at least one-quarter Alaska Native descent, and must not be a member of any other regional corporation unless through inheritance or gift. Sealaska is one of the few ANCSA Regional Corporations to elect to enroll descendants and allot them shares.

Sealaska has established a Permanent Fund, comprising investments in stocks, bonds, real estate and private equity funds, as a source of shareholder dividends.

Sealaska reinvests a significant portion of its earnings back into its community-oriented subsidiaries, as well as offers its own opportunities for young shareholders. Program offerings include things like scholarships for both full- and part-time students, wellness and culture camps, summer internships, and the Board Youth Advisor position.

Lands

Despite having the most shareholders of any regional corporation, it received the least amount of land in the 44 million acre settlement. Sealaska received a second conveyance of land, approximately 65,000 acres, as a result of advocacy in Congress. Sealaska's current land holdings in Southeast Alaska are roughly 1.6 percent of the traditional homelands that the Tlingit, Haida, and Tsimshian people inhabited for more than 10,000 years. There are also five traditional communities that were left out of the original ANCSA conveyance. Sealaska is working to get these communities the land due to them.

Business enterprises

Sealaska’s primary economic drivers are natural resources, land management, environmental services and seafood.

References

1972 establishments in Alaska
Alaska Native culture in Juneau
Alaska Native regional corporations
Companies based in Juneau, Alaska
Tlingit